Intiraymi Airport  is an extremely high elevation airport serving the Franklin Mining, Inc. silver and gold mining concession at La Joya in the Oruro Department of Bolivia.

There is high terrain southeast of the runway.

See also

Transport in Bolivia
List of airports in Bolivia

References

External links 
OpenStreetMap - Intiraymi Airport
OurAirports - Intiraymi Airport

Airports in Oruro Department